Priyar is a rural locality (a khutor) in Petropavlovskoye Rural Settlement, Liskinsky District, Voronezh Oblast, Russia. The population was 217 as of 2010. There are 3 streets.

Geography 
Priyar is located 54 km southeast of Liski (the district's administrative centre) by road. Vladimirovka is the nearest rural locality.

References 

Rural localities in Liskinsky District